The Church of the Virgin Mary is a Romanian Orthodox church located at 42 Unirii Boulevard in Focșani, Romania. It is dedicated to the Dormition of the Theotokos.

The church was built in 1709–1716. It is listed as a historic monument by Romania's Ministry of Culture and Religious Affairs.

Notes

Religious buildings and structures in Focșani
Historic monuments in Vrancea County
Romanian Orthodox churches in Vrancea County
Churches completed in 1716